Golden Nugget Casino DS is a 2005 video game developed by American studio Skyworks Interactive and released by Majesco Entertainment for the Nintendo DS.  The game, named for the Las Vegas casino of the same name, is the first Golden Nugget themed game released for the DS.  A prior game was released for the Game Boy Advance in 2004 (this Game Boy Advance game was later released again in 2005 as a 2 Games in 1 pack along with Texas Hold Em Poker), and another prior game was released for the Nintendo 64 (called Golden Nugget 64) back in 1998, preceded by a  prior game for the PlayStation back in 1997 and the PC back in 1996.

The player begins with $2,000.00.  Although the cartridge saves a player's winnings, a player can reset the amount to $2,000.00 at any point.

Games
The following games are included:

Blackjack
Craps
North Slots
South Slots
Money Wheel
Video poker
Roulette

When a game is selected, the game offers several betting limits to choose from, as well as three of each version of slots and video poker.

Reception
Craig Harris of IGN gave the game a 5.0 out of 10, writing "(T)here's really nothing 'broken' about Golden Nugget Casino. It's just that the developer didn't exactly go above and beyond the call. All you're getting is the ability to play these casino games in a single player fashion".

References

2005 video games
Casino video games
Majesco Entertainment games
Nintendo DS games
Nintendo DS-only games
North America-exclusive video games
Video games developed in the United States
Video games set in hotels
Video games set in the Las Vegas Valley
Video games set in Nevada